Yousuf Khalfan (Arabic:يوسف خلفان) (born 2 March 1989) is an Emirati footballer. He currently plays for Al Urooba as a midfielder.

Career

Al-Fujairah
Yousuf Khalfan started his career at Al-Fujairah and is a product of the Al-Fujairah's youth system. On 28 May 2015, made his professional debut for Al-Fujairah against Al Ain in the Pro League, replacing Humaid Ahmed . landed with Al-Fujairah from the UAE Pro League to the UAE First Division League in 2015-16 season. ended up with Al-Fujairah from the UAE First Division League to the UAE Pro League in the 2017-18 season.

Dibba Al-Fujaurah
On 26 July 2017, left Al-Fujairah and signed with Dibba Al-Fujairah. On 14 October 2017, made his professional debut for Dibba Al-Fujairah against Al-Nasr in the Pro League, replacing Yaseen al-Bakhit . landed with Dibba Al-Fujairah from the UAE Pro League to the UAE First Division League in 2018-19 season.

References

External links
 

1989 births
Living people
Emirati footballers
Fujairah FC players
Dibba FC players
Al Urooba Club players
UAE Pro League players
UAE First Division League players
Association football midfielders
Place of birth missing (living people)